Biomedical Microdevices is a bimonthly peer-reviewed scientific journal covering applications of Bio-MEMS (Microelectromechanical systems) and biomedical nanotechnology. It is published by Springer Science+Business Media and the editor-in-chief are Alessandro Grattoni (Houston Methodist Research Institute) and Arum Han (Texas A&M University).

Abstracting and indexing
The journal is abstracted/indexed in:

According to the Journal Citation Reports, the journal has a 2021 impact factor of 3.783.

References

External links

English-language journals
Publications established in 1998
Biomedical engineering journals
Bimonthly journals
Springer Science+Business Media academic journals